The Women's 200 metres event  at the 2004 IAAF World Indoor Championships was held on March 6–7.

Medalists

Note: Anastasiya Kapachinskaya of Russia originally won the gold medal, but was disqualified after she tested positive for performance enhancing drugs.

Results

Heat
First 2 of each heat (Q) and next 2 fastest (q) qualified for the semifinals.

Semifinals
First 3 of each semifinal (Q) qualified for the final.

Final

References
Results

2004 IAAF World Indoor Championships
200 metres at the IAAF World Indoor Championships
2004 in women's athletics